The 2018 Copa CONMEBOL Libertadores de Futsal was the 18th edition of the Copa Libertadores de Futsal, South America's premier club futsal tournament organized by CONMEBOL.

The tournament was held at Carlos Barbosa, Brazil between 22–29 April 2018.

Defending champions Carlos Barbosa defeated Joinville in the final to win their fifth title. Sorocaba defeated Cerro Porteño to finish third.

Teams
The competition is contested by 12 teams: the title holders, one entry from each of the ten CONMEBOL associations, plus an additional entry from the host association.

Venues
The tournament was played at the Centro Municipal de Eventos in Carlos Barbosa.

Draw
The draw of the tournament was held on 3 April 2018 at the Centro Municipal de Eventos in Carlos Barbosa. The 12 teams were drawn into three groups of four containing one team from each of the four seeding pots. The following three teams were seeded:
Group A: 2017 Copa Libertadores de Futsal champions, Carlos Barbosa (Brazil)
Group B: 2017 Copa Libertadores de Futsal runners-up, Cerro Porteño (Paraguay)
Group C: champions of the host association, Sorocaba (Brazil)

The other teams were seeded based on the results of their association in the 2017 Copa Libertadores de Futsal, with the additional entry from the host association seeded last.

Squads
Each team has to submit a squad of 14 players, including a minimum of two goalkeepers (Regulations Article 31).

Group stage
The top two teams of each group and the two best third-placed teams advance to the quarter-finals. The teams are ranked according to points (3 points for a win, 1 point for a draw, 0 points for a loss). If tied on points, tiebreakers are applied in the following order (Regulations Article 21):
Results in head-to-head matches between tied teams (points, goal difference, goals scored);
Goal difference in all matches;
Goals scored in all matches;
Drawing of lots.

All times are local, BRT (UTC−3).

Group A

Group B

Group C

Ranking of third-placed teams

Knockout stage
In the quarter-finals, semi-finals and final, extra time and penalty shoot-out are used to decide the winner if necessary. In the third place match, penalty shoot-out (no extra time) is used to decide the winner if necessary.

Bracket
The quarter-final matchups are:
QF1: Winner Group A vs. 2nd Best Third Place
QF2: Winner Group B vs. 1st Best Third Place
QF3: Winner Group C vs. Runner-up Group A
QF4: Runner-up Group B vs. Runner-up Group C

The semi-final matchups are:
SF1: Winner QF1 vs. Winner QF4
SF2: Winner QF2 vs. Winner QF3

Quarter-finals

Semi-finals

Third place match

Final

References

External links
CONMEBOL Libertadores Futsal Brasil 2018, CONMEBOL.com

2018
2018 in South American futsal
2018 in Brazilian football
April 2018 sports events in South America
International futsal competitions hosted by Brazil